The Beaudet River (in French: rivière Beaudet) is a tributary of the Gentilly River which flows onto the south shore of the St. Lawrence River.

The Beaudet river flows in the municipalities of Sainte-Marie-de-Blandford, located in the Bécancour Regional County Municipality), in the region administrative office of Centre-du-Québec, in Quebec, in Canada.

Geography 

The main neighboring hydrographic slopes of the Beaudet River are:
 north side: rivière aux Glaises, rivière aux Orignaux (Gentilly), rivière du Moulin (Gentilly);
 east side: rivière du Moulin (Bécancour River tributary), Gentilly River, Petite rivière du Chêne, Geoffroy stream;
 south side: Gentilly River, Bécancour River;
 west side: Gentilly River, Gentilly South-West River, Bécancour River.

The Beaudet River rises at the limit of the municipalities of Lemieux and Sainte-Marie-de-Blandford.

  northwest, to route 226;
  west, to route 263;
  west, crossing the Route des Flamants, to its confluence.

The Beaudet River empties on the west bank of the Gentilly River.

Toponymy 
The toponym "rivière Baudet" was made official on August 17, 1978, at the Commission de toponymie du Québec.

See also 

 List of rivers of Quebec

Notes and references 

Rivers of Centre-du-Québec
Bécancour Regional County Municipality